Terry Ronald LaValley (born March 26, 1956) is an American prelate of the Roman Catholic Church. He has been serving as the bishop of the Diocese of Ogdensburg in Northern New York since 2010. He is the first native of the Diocese of Ogdensburg Diocese to serve as its bishop since the appointment of Bishop Joseph H. Conroy in 1921.

Biography

Early life and education
The second of six children,Terry LaValley was born on March 26, 1956, in Plattsburgh, New York, to Ronald and Doris LaValley. He was raised in St. Ann's Parish and received his early education at Mooers Central School in Mooers, New York. LaValley graduated from Northeastern Clinton Central High School in Champlain, New York. He attended the State University of New York at Albany (SUNY Albany) for two years.  In 1977. LaValley enlisted in the United States Navy, serving there until 1983. In 1980, he received a Bachelor of Arts degree from SUNY Albany.

In 1983, LaValley entered Wadhams Hall Seminary College in Ogdensburg, New York, earning a Certificate of Studies in Philosophy the following year. He continued his studies at Christ the King Seminary in East Aurora, New York. He received a Master of Divinity degree from Christ the King in 1988.

Ordination and ministry
LaValley was ordained to the priesthood for the Diocese of Ogdensburg by Bishop Stanislaus J. Brzana on September 24, 1988. His first assignment was as a curate at Sacred Heart Parish in Massena, New York. During his time at Sacred Heart, he also served as associate secretary of the diocesan marriage tribunal and a member of the Presbyteral Council. LaValley completed his graduate studies at St. Paul's University in Ottawa, Ontario, where he earned a Doctor of Canon Law degree in 1994.

Upon his return to New York, LaValley was named administrator of both St. Peter's Parish in Hammond, New York and St. Patrick's Mission Parish in Rossie, New York, as well as adjutant judicial vicar for the dioceseIn 1996, LaValley became episcopal vicar for diocesan services and chancellor of the diocese. In addition to these responsibilities, he was appointed pastor of St. Raphael Parish in Heuvelton, New York (1998) and administrator of St. James Parish in Gouverneur, New York (1999). He returned to St. Raphael's in 2000, and became rector of St. Mary's Cathedral Parish in 2003.

In 2004, LaValley was relieved of his duties as episcopal vicar and chancellor, and named as Bishop Robert J. Cunningham's delegate to implement and oversee compliance with the Charter for the Protection of Children and Young People. On May 28, 2009, LaValley was elected the apostolic administrator of the diocese by the College of Consultors, following installation of Bishop Cunningham as Bishop of Syracuse.

Bishop of Ogdensburg, New York
On February 23, 2010, LaValley was appointed as the fourteenth bishop of the Diocese of Ogdensburg by Pope Benedict XVI. His episcopal consecration by Cardinal Timothy M. Dolan took place at St. Mary's Cathedral on April 30, 2010.

In May 2018, LaValley expressed his opposition to the New York Child Victims Act, which created a one-year window for adults to sue for sexual abuse crimes.  Before the law was finally passed, LaValley started a compensation program for sexual abuse victims within the diocese.  In an interview, LaValley made this comment about the scandal: "The Church screwed up big time and people have been hurt immeasurably. How many times can I say I'm sorry for all that happened? What else can I do, I don't know."

See also

 Catholic Church hierarchy
 Catholic Church in the United States
 Historical list of the Catholic bishops of the United States
 List of Catholic bishops of the United States
 Lists of patriarchs, archbishops, and bishops

References

External links
 Roman Catholic Diocese of Ogdensburg Official Site
 St. Ann's Parish
 Church of the Sacred Heart
 St. Raphael Church
 St. James Church
 St. Mary's Cathedral

 

1956 births
Living people
People from Plattsburgh, New York
University at Albany, SUNY alumni
Roman Catholic bishops of Ogdensburg
21st-century Roman Catholic bishops in the United States